Fiyoaree or Fiori (Dhivehi: ފިޔޯރީ) is one of the inhabited islands of Gaafu Dhaalu Atoll, Maldives.

History
Women of this island used to weave mats of lesser quality than those of Gaddu, but in larger quantities.

Archaeology
There are sizeable Buddhist ruins on this island which have been largely unexplored. The most important one is a ruin, probably a large Stupa, measuring about 32 feet in circumference and 3 feet in height is found on the western side of the island.

These archaeological remains have not been properly investigated yet.fiyoaree is the only island where the original raw materials of met(thudukuna)are growing.

Geography

Demography

References

H. C. P. Bell, The Maldive Islands; Monograph on the History, Archaeology and Epigraphy. Reprint Colombo 1940. Council for Linguistic and Historical Research. Malé 1989
H.C.P. Bell, Excerpta Maldiviana. Reprint Colombo 1922/35 edn. Asian Educational Services. New Delhi 1999
 Xavier Romero-Frias, The Maldive Islanders, A Study of the Popular Culture of an Ancient Ocean Kingdom. Barcelona 1999, 

Islands of the Maldives